Morro Reatino is a  (municipality) in the Province of Rieti in the Italian region of Lazio, located about  northeast of Rome and about  north of Rieti.

References

Cities and towns in Lazio